The 1997 Division One Championship season was the second tier of British rugby league during the 1997 season. The competition featured eleven teams, with Hull Sharks winning the league, and Huddersfield Giants winning the Divisional Premiership.

Championship
The league was won by Hull Sharks, winning promotion to the Super League along with runners-up the Huddersfield Giants. The Huddersfield Giants also won the Divisional Premiership final against Hull FC, with Craig Weston winning the Tom Bergin Trophy.

The Widnes Vikings and Workington Town were both relegated to Division Two.

League table

Premiership

See also
1997 Challenge Cup

References

External links

1997 season at wigan.rlfans.com

Rugby Football League Championship
RFL Division One